Lake Monduran is a rural locality in the Bundaberg Region, Queensland, Australia. In the  Lake Monduran had a population of 3 people.

Geography 
The locality contains the lake of the same name, created by the Fred Haigh Dam, and the immediately surrounding foreshores of the lake and the dam and associated infrastructure.

History 
The locality takes its name from the lake, which in turn takes its name from the pastoral run held by John and James Landsborough (brothers of William Landsborough) in 1857.

The Fred Haigh Dam was constructed across the Kolan River in 1978 creating Lake Monduran. The lake was officially named on 1 January 1980 and gazetted on 5 January 1980.

In the  Lake Monduran had a population of 3 people.

Education 
There are no schools in the locality. The nearest primary school is Gin Gin State School in Gin Gin to the south and the nearest secondary school in Gin Gin State High School in Gin Gin.

Attractions 
The lake is popular for fishing as it is stocked with Australian bass, barramundi, golden perch, saratoga, silver perch and sooty grunter, but a Stocked Impoundment Permit must be obtained.

The lake is popular for boating with a boat ramp at Fred Haig Dam, which is managed by the Bundaberg Regional Council.

There is a lookout at the park at the dam wall on Monduran Dam Road. Adjacent is the privately-operated Lake Monduran Holiday Park with cabins and facilities for caravans and camping and houseboat rentals. There is a public camping reserve on the Bruce Highway (corner with Hintons Road) beside the Kolan River.

References 

Bundaberg Region
Localities in Queensland